Sabine Toutain (born in 1966) is a contemporary French violist.

Biography

Training and prizes 
Sabine Toutain was born in Le Mans in 1966; she began her musical studies there and then entered the Conservatoire de Paris in 1982.

In 1984, she won the first prize of alto in Serge Collot's class and first prize in Chamber music with Bruno Pasquier.
She perfected herself in Jean Moullière's string quartet class in order to take part in international competitions. She was then a finalist in the Eurovision competition for young musicians and a prize-winner of the Maurice Vieux International Viola Competition. Finally, she won the second prize at the Geneva International Music Competition and the Jacques Murgier Prize at the international competition of Reims.

Career 
Since 1990, she has been performing in many European concert halls and festivals, either as a soloist (Bartok and Walton's concertos with the Orchestre national de France for example) or as part of the Turner Trio concerts where she played with two other musicians of the Orchestre national: harpist Isabelle Perrin and flautist Philippe Pierlot.

She is the dedicatee of new works, notably Episode Six by Betsy Jolas and in 1989 Chant II by Ramon Lazkano, for viola and tapes.

Teaching 
Passionate about teaching, since 2000 she has been teaching the viola at the Conservatoire de Paris.

Discography 

References

External links 
 Sabine Toutain on France Musique
 Sabine Toutain biography
 Sabine Toutain on Discogs
 Sabine Toutain on BBC Music

French classical violists
Women violists
Conservatoire de Paris alumni
Academic staff of the Conservatoire de Paris
1966 births
People from Le Mans
Living people
Eurovision Young Musicians Finalists
Women music educators
20th-century French women musicians
21st-century French women musicians
20th-century violists
21st-century violists